This list ranks building and structures in Sheffield, England, by height.

Completed structures
This includes buildings that are topped out, even if they are not yet internally complete.

An equals sign (=) following a rank indicates the same height between two or more buildings. The "Year" column indicates the year in which a building was completed. Buildings that have been demolished are not included.

Completed

Incomplete

Under construction
Under construction buildings that have already been topped out are listed above in the completed list.

The "Year" column indicates the year in which a building is scheduled to be completed.

Approved

Unbuilt

Unbuilt
Some of these may still be constructed if the plans are resubmitted.

Demolished
This lists buildings and structures in the Sheffield City Region that were at least 50 metres (164 ft) tall and have since been demolished or dismantled.

An equals sign (=) following a rank indicates the same height between two or more buildings.

Timeline of tallest buildings

See also 
Brutalism in Sheffield, for a list of brutalism-era council apartment blocks in the city which do not make this list.

References

Buildings and structures in Sheffield
Sheffield
Tallest
Tallest buildings and structures